Baptist Creek is a tributary of the Vermillion River, located in the southeastern South Dakota county of Clay.

A large share of the first settlers being Swedish Baptists caused the name to be selected.

See also
List of rivers of South Dakota

References

External links

Rivers of South Dakota
Rivers of Clay County, South Dakota